Marco Perrotta (born 14 February 1994) is an Italian footballer who plays as a defender for  club Pro Vercelli on loan from Bari.

Club career
On 1 September 2022, Perrotta joined Pro Vercelli on loan.

Career statistics

Club

References

External links
 

1994 births
Living people
People from Campobasso
Sportspeople from the Province of Campobasso
Footballers from Molise
Italian footballers
Association football defenders
Serie B players
Serie C players
Delfino Pescara 1936 players
Paganese Calcio 1926 players
S.S. Teramo Calcio players
U.S. Avellino 1912 players
S.S.C. Bari players
Palermo F.C. players
F.C. Pro Vercelli 1892 players